Silver Streak may refer to:

 AJS Silver Streak, a British motorcycle
 Short Silver Streak, a British aircraft
 Silver Streak (bus), a bus rapid transit system
 Silver Streak (comics), a comic book character
 Silver Streak (film), a 1976 comedy, action and mystery film
 Silver Streak (ride), an amusement ride
 Silver Streak (Canada's Wonderland), a roller coaster at Canada's Wonderland, Vaughan, Ontario
 "Silver Streak", a nickname for the Pioneer Zephyr
 Silver Streak Zephyr, a passenger train
 "Silver streak" trainspotter's nickname for LNER Class A4 for the original silver color scheme
 The Silver Streak, a 1934 film
 SEMTA Commuter Rail, also known as "Silver Streak"
 Silver Streak (dog)

See also
 Blue Streak (disambiguation)
 Red Streak
 Silverstreak
 Yellow streak